Onttola railway station (abbrev. Ont) is a train station along the Pieksämäki–Joensuu line in Finland.

Station building
The original log-frame station building was built in the 1920s according to plans drawn up by Thure Hellström, an architect for the Finnish National Railway Board. The same types of station buildings were erected in 19 villages and towns along the Joensuu–Varkaus and Oulu–Kontiomäki lines. The Onttola railway station was closed down in May 1976.
 
In 2000, the original station building was dismantled and its log frame was moved to the town of Nurmes, where it was renovated and turned into the reception building for LomaSirmakka. The reception building was officially opened in June 2005.

Railway stations in South Karelia
Railway stations opened in 1927
Railway stations closed in 1976
Joensuu